Château Trpísty (Schloss Trpist in German, Zámek Trpísty in Czech) is a late baroque 18th century manor house located at Trpísty in the Plzeň Region of the Czech Republic. It was built between 1723 and 1729 for Count Prosper Anton Josef von Sinzendorf on the site of a medieval castle.

Because the house archive was lost in late 18th century, the identity of the architect is not clear. Recent research favours the authorship of Jakub Auguston, an architect of Italian descent living in Pilsen (Plzeň in Czech). The extravagant layout and decoration of the house set it apart from Auguston's other works in provincial style, so Trpisty either is his best and most mature project or it has been designed by somebody else. The layout of the building is based on two pavilions (the North and South Wing) connected by two large oval rooms protruding in the middle of the East and West facades. The piano nobile on the first floor is lavishly decorated with allegorical baroque frescoes in stucco mirrors, while the main drawing room boasts a large fresco on its entire vaulted ceiling depicting an apotheosis of the Sinzendorf family and historic scenes from the Ottoman Court.

The large formal garden was landscaped in the English style in the 19th century and contains today a rich collection of rare trees, among them a 19th-century female Ginkgo tree.

The château, its park and outbuildings are among the last remaining examples of 18th century Bohemian country houses embedded in its original landscape without visible changes in the wake of industrialisation or subsequent destruction during the communist rule and belong to the most valuable historic estates in Central Europe.

Notes
 

Houses completed in 1729
Tachov District
Houses in the Czech Republic
Buildings and structures in the Plzeň Region
1729 establishments in the Holy Roman Empire

cs:Trpísty (zámek)y
de:Trpísty
nl:Trpísty
sk:Trpísty